Benny Goodman Today  is a jazz compilation album by Benny Goodman. It was released in 1970 and features big band and small group selections recorded during a concert in Stockholm, Sweden.  It was released in the United States on the London Records label (London SPB 21, 2-LP set) as a "phase 4 stereo spectacular".

The album, as issued, has a few shortcomings, among them a failure to list the band personnel, despite a double gatefold album with an included booklet full of band photos.  And some of the band arrangements are new, and rather uncharacteristic of Goodman's classic style.

Personnel
(Source Roy Willox)
 Bass: Lennie Bush
 Drums: Bobby Orr
 Guitar: Louis Stewart Bucky Pizzarelli
 Piano: Bill McGuffie
 Saxophone: Bob Burns, Don Honeywell, Bob Efford, Frank Reidy, Dave Willis
 Trombone: Nat Peck, Keith Christie, Jim Wilson
 Trumpet: Derek Watkins, Greg Bowen, John Maclevy

References

1970 compilation albums
Benny Goodman albums
London Records albums